Ali Nagi Huseynov (azeri. Əli Nağı Məmmədhəsən oğlu Hüseynov) was born May 5, 1900 in Salyan. From December 1918 until the end of 1919 he was a private of the 4th Quba Regiment of the Armed Forces of the Azerbaijan Democratic Republic. From December 1919 to April 1920 he studied at the cadet school in Ganja, and then until September 1920 at the Baku Unified School. He was appointed as the squadron commander in the 2nd border brigade. Since 1920, he continued to serve in the Red Army.

Life 
During the Winter War Ali Nagi Huseynov with the rank of captain commanded a rifle regiment. For the distinguished leadership of the regiment and personal courage, he was awarded the Order of the Red Banner, and also received from Tymoshenko’s hands a personal award weapon - a saber. In 1941 he became a major, commanded a regiment in the 151st Infantry Division on the Western and Central Fronts. He was wounded, left the encirclement and awarded the second Order of the Red Banner.

After his recovery in a hospital he was appointed a commander of the 402nd Azerbaijan Rifle Division in February 1942. On 4 October  1942, the 402nd Rifle Division was transferred to Gudermes, where it became part of the 9th Rifle Corps of the 44th Army of the Northern Group of Forces of the Transcaucasian Front. From 3 October  to 27 November 1942, the division defended at the approaches to Grozny on the right bank of the Terek. On the orders of the commander of the 44th Army, Major General Vasily Khomenko, on 30 November 1942, the 402nd Division, in cooperation with the 114th and 416th Rifle Divisions and the 5th Guards Don Cossack Cavalry Corps, went on the offensive in the direction of Sheftovo-Mozdok with aim to defeat the Mozdok group of the enemy and by 12 December to free Mozdok.

During the period from 30 November to 11 December 1942, Units of the 402nd Rifle Division in fierce battles liberated the settlements of Otrashnikovo, Staro-Bukhirovo, Shirkutovskoye, Khokhlatsky, Smirnovka, Poti-Onin, Sborny, Naydenovsky. The fighting was carried out without the support of tanks and with weak artillery support. In December 1942 he was transferred to service in the rear and reserve units, including as part of the 1st Belorussian Front. 

At the end of the war A military commander of Charlottenburg district of Berlin, responsible for the restoration of the city, namely the supply of water, light, food products, opening stores. After establishing the order and ending the active phase of the post-war proceedings and determining new tasks, establishing contacts with the civilian population and the new German authorities, colonel Huseynov received an invitation to return to Azerbaijan. At the Ministry of Education of the Republic, he became deputy minister for military training. Since December 1945 in reserve.

Awards: the Order of Lenin, two Orders of the Red Banner, the Order of the Red Star, the medal "For the Defense of the Caucasus", other medals, and personalized weapons.

A school carries his name and a street in his birth town of Salyan, Azerbaijan.

References 

1900 births
1957 deaths